Bleatarn is a hamlet in Cumbria, England.

See also
List of places in Cumbria

References

External links
 Cumbria County History Trust: Warcop (nb: provisional research only – see Talk page)

Hamlets in Cumbria
Warcop